The ACT Observatory  is an astronomical observatory owned and operated by the Astronomy Club of Tulsa. It was also known as Mounds/RMCC Observatory before being renamed in 2010.

See also 
List of astronomical observatories

References
 

Astronomical observatories in Oklahoma
Buildings and structures in Tulsa County, Oklahoma